Villejuif–Paul Vaillant-Couturier is a station of the Paris Métro, located on Line 7. It serves the commune of Villejuif.

History
It was opened when Line 7 was extended from Le Kremlin-Bicêtre to Villejuif–Louis Aragon on 28 February 1985.

It is named after the Avenue Paul Vaillant-Couturier and the former mayor of Villejuif, Paul Vaillant-Couturier (1892–1937) who was a journalist, politician and editor of the Communist newspaper l’Humanité.

In 2021, attendance gradually increased, with 1,764,879 passengers entering this station which places it in the 200th position of metro stations for its usage.

Passenger services

Access
The station has three entrances:
 Access 1 Boulevard Maxime-Gorki/Rue Jean-Baptiste-Clément, with a fixed staircase;
 Access 2 Boulevard Maxime-Gorki/Rue Condorcet, on the even numbers side, with a fixed staircase and an escalator. This entrance is indicated by a mast surmounted by a yellow M logo;
 Access 3 Maxim Gorky Boulevard, with a fixed staircase, also indicated by a mast surmounted by a yellow M logo.

Station layout

Platforms
Villejuif - Paul Vaillant-Couturier is a standard configuration station. It has two platforms separated by the metro tracks, surmounted by a mezzanine. The name of the station is written in Parisine font on enamelled plates. Lighting is provided by suspended luminous globes, small ceramic tiles of a white and orange colour placed vertically covering the walls as well as the tunnel exits. The furniture is the Motte style in an orange colour.

Bus connections
The station is served by lines 162 and 185 of the RATP Bus Network, the v7 urban service of the Valouette bus network and, at night, by lines N15 and N22 of the Noctilien network.

Nearby
 Hôpital Paul-Brousse

Gallery

References

External links 
Roland, Gérard (2003). Stations de métro. D’Abbesses à Wagram. Éditions Bonneton.

Paris Métro stations in Villejuif
Railway stations in France opened in 1985